Wirö (also called Itoto, Wotuja, Jojod, or various forms of Maku) is an indigenous language of Colombia and Venezuela. Until it was documented in 2015, it was attested only by a list of 38 words collected ca. 1900, though even that was enough to show it was closely related to Piaroa. Speakers of the two understand each other, though not reliably, and consider them to be distinct languages.

Loukotka (1968) reports it as being spoken on the Ventuari River and Cunucunuma River.

Maco is not a proper name but a label applied by Arawakan speakers for unintelligible languages. In the case of Wirö, the following forms are found in the literature: Maco, Mako, Maku, Makú, Sáliba-Maco, and Maco-Piaroa, the latter also for the combination of Wirö and Piaroa.

Further reading
Rosés Labrada, Jorge E. (2015). The Mako language: Vitality, Grammar and Classification. London: University of Western Ontario. (Doctoral dissertation). Electronic Thesis and Dissertation Repository, 2851.

References

Piaroa–Saliban languages